Open Your Heart (’Iftaḥ Qalbak) is an Algerian psychosocial reality television talk show hosted by Salima Souakri. It is the local adaptation of the French series Y'a que la vérité qui compte.

Concept 
A person asks the production to invite another person on the set to "make an important statement".

The guest has no idea of the reason for his invitation, nor of the person who wishes to speak to him, before entering the set.

At that moment, the two persons (the inviter and the guest) are separated by a "curtain" and can only see themselves through two television screens. This allows the guest to know the person who wanted to meet him.

A discussion then starts between the two persons. The inviter exposes what he has to say, and this may concern a declaration of love, reunion of childhood friends, etc., and the guest answers to him.

The guest, a few minutes later, decides whether or not he wants to meet in real life the person who invited him. If he refuses, the two people return without meeting; if he accepts, the curtain opens.

Episodes

See also 
 Television in Algeria

References

External links 
  
 

2010s Algerian television series
2010s reality television series
2016 Algerian television series debuts
Algerian television series
Arabic-language television shows
Echorouk TV original programming